Chevrillon may refer to:

Places
 Chevrillon Lake, Quebec, Canada

Persons
André Chevrillon (1864–1957), a French writer
Benjamin Antier (1787–1870), a French playwright, born Benjamin Chevrillon